This is a list of notable footballers who have played for Derby County. Generally, this means players that have played 100 or more first-class matches for the club. Other players who have played an important role for the club can be included, but the reason why they have been included should be added in the 'Notes' column.

For a list of all Derby County players, major or minor, with a Wikipedia article, see Category:Derby County F.C. players, and for the current squad see the main Derby County F.C. article.

Table

Players are listed according to the date of their first team debut. Appearances and goals are for first-team competitive matches only; wartime matches are excluded. Substitute appearances included.

The 'International' column denotes footballers who gained a full international cap.

References 
 

Derby County
 
Players
Association football player non-biographical articles